The term beltfish can refer to either:

 Trichiurus lepturus (largehead hairtail, Atlantic cutlassfish, Pacific cutlassfish)
 Lepidopus caudatus (silver scabbardfish, frostfish, ribbonfish, scabbardfish, southern frostfish)